Limnophyes paludis is a species of fly belonging to the family Chironomidae (non-biting midges). This is a relatively large dark brown midge (total length up to 3.3 mm) with distinctive lanceolate setae on the thorax. Originally discovered on emergent vegetation in The Swale National Nature Reserve, Kent, England, it has since been recorded in other parts of northwest Europe.

References

Limnophyes paludis at Fauna Europaea

Chironomidae
Insects described in 1985